Ceroplesis minuta is a species of beetle in the family Cerambycidae. It was described by Karl Jordan in 1894. It is known from South Africa.

References

minuta
Beetles described in 1894